Horsham is a local government district in West Sussex, England.  Its council is based in Horsham.  The district borders those of Crawley, Mid Sussex, Mole Valley, Chichester, Arun and Adur, and the unitary authority of Brighton & Hove.

The district was formed on 1 April 1974, under the Local Government Act 1972, by the merger of Horsham urban district along with Chanctonbury Rural District and Horsham Rural District.

On a Channel 4 television programme in 2007, the Horsham district was classed as the ninth best district to live in the United Kingdom.

Between the 2001 UK Census and the 2011 UK Census, the district's population grew by 7.4% from 122,300 to 131,300.

Civil parishes
Within the Horsham District are the following civil parishes:

Education

The Rikkyo School in England, a Japanese boarding school, is located in the Rudgwick community in Horsham District.

See also
Horsham District Council elections

References

External links

 
Non-metropolitan districts of West Sussex